Myint Aung is a Burmese politician and political prisoner who currently serves as a Magway Region Hluttaw member of parliament for Kamma Township. In the 1990 Burmese general election, he was elected as an Pyithu Hluttaw MP, winning a majority of 28,340 (72% of the votes), but was never allowed to assume his seat.

References

Members of Pyithu Hluttaw
National League for Democracy politicians
Prisoners and detainees of Myanmar
1959 births
Living people
University of Yangon alumni